
Gmina Waśniów is a rural gmina (administrative district) in Ostrowiec County, Świętokrzyskie Voivodeship, in south-central Poland.

The gmina contains part of the protected area called Jeleniowska Landscape Park.

Villages
Gmina Waśniów contains the villages and settlements of Boksyce, Boleszyn, Czajęcice, Czażów, Dobruchna, Garbacz, Grzegorzowice, Janowice, Jeżów, Kotarszyn, Kraszków, Milejowice, Mirogonowice, Momina, Nagorzyce, Nosów, Nowy Skoszyn, Pękosławice, Piotrów, Prusinowice, Roztylice, Sarnia Zwola, Sławęcice, Śnieżkowice, Strupice, Stryczowice, Wałsnów, Waśniów, Witosławice, Wojciechowice, Worowice, Wronów and Zajączkowice.

Neighbouring gminas
Gmina Waśniów is bordered by the gminas of Baćkowice, Bodzechów, Kunów, Łagów, Nowa Słupia, Pawłów and Sadowie.

References
Polish official population figures 2006

Wasniow
Ostrowiec County